Hungarian Bandy Federation (Magyar Bandy Szövetség) is the governing body for bandy in Hungary. The headquarters is in Budapest. The association was founded in 1988 as Magyar Jéglabda Szövetség and became a member in Federation of International Bandy in 1989.

National team
  men's team
  women's team

References

Link
 http://www.bandy.hu/

Bandy in Hungary
Bandy governing bodies
Bandy
Federation of International Bandy members
1988 establishments in Hungary
Sports organizations established in 1988